Jean-François Dumoulin (born May 5, 1976) is a Canadian racing driver. He competes in the Tudor United SportsCar Championship for Magnus Racing, as well as the NASCAR Pinty's Series. He is the older brother of Louis-Philippe Dumoulin.

Grand-Am career
He made his first career start in the series in 2000 with a fifth-place finish in his class. The following year, he earned a class victory at the Circuit Trois-Rivières. He also competed at the KONI Challenge Series and earned a class victory at Watkins Glen International. In 2002, he won the KONI Championship in the ST Class, despite not winning a single event. He won six races in the GSI class the following year and captured the title. In 2004, he competed in the Rolex 24 at Daytona for the SGS class and won, along with eight other starts in the series. Then in 2007, he captured a GT victory at the same event at Daytona. Dumoulin would drive 11 more races and finished ninth in the standings. In the KONI Series, he won at Watkins Glen International in one of his three starts. For 2008, he co-drove for the #15 Ford Mustang Cobra team of Blackforest Motorsports along with Tom Nastasi, David Empringham and Boris Said, Dumoulin drove two races that season (Daytona and Montreal).

NASCAR career
Dumoulin competed at the 2009 NAPA Auto Parts 200 at Montreal for the #23 car team for R3 Motorsports; he finished in seventh place with a largely damaged car, including a busted radiator. It was also the first top 10 finish in the team's history.

Personal life
He is the older brother of the other racing driver: Louis-Philippe Dumoulin. They are both sons of the other competitor: Richard Dumoulin.

NASCAR career results

Motorsports career results

NASCAR
(key) (Bold – Pole position awarded by qualifying time. Italics – Pole position earned by points standings or practice time. * – Most laps led.)

Nationwide Series

Pinty's Series

Whelen Euro Series – Elite 1

References

External links
 
 
 Jean-François Dumoulin Grand-Am bio
 

1976 births
24 Hours of Daytona drivers
Atlantic Championship drivers
Living people
NASCAR drivers
Racing drivers from Quebec
Rolex Sports Car Series drivers
Sportspeople from Trois-Rivières
WeatherTech SportsCar Championship drivers